Louis A. Craig (July 29, 1891 – January 3, 1984) was a career officer in the United States Army.  He attained the rank of major general, and served in both World War I and World War II. Craig served as a corps and division commander during World War II and was the Inspector General of the Army from 1948 to 1952.

Early life and military career
Louis Aleck Craig Jr. was born at West Point, New York, on July 29, 1891, a son of Army officer Louis Aleck Craig and Georgie (Malin) Craig.  His siblings included brother Malin Craig and his paternal grandfather was James Craig.  After graduating from St. Luke's, a Catholic prep school in Wayne, Pennsylvania, Craig attended the United States Military Academy.  He received his commission as a second lieutenant of Cavalry after graduating in 1913, ranked 56th in a class of 93. Several of his fellow graduates included men who would eventually become general officers, such as William R. Schmidt, Alexander Patch, Charles H. Corlett, Willis D. Crittenberger, Paul Newgarden, Lunsford E. Oliver, Geoffrey Keyes and Henry Balding Lewis.

Craig was initially assigned to the 5th Cavalry Regiment and served at Fort Huachuca, Arizona, and Fort Myer, Virginia.  In March, 1914 Craig transferred to the Coast Artillery Corps and was assigned to Fort Hamilton, New York.  His subsequent assignments included Fort Howard, Maryland, and Fort Grant, Panama Canal Zone.  In August, 1916, Craig transferred to the Field Artillery and served with the 4th Field Artillery Regiment at Corozal, Panama Canal Zone.

World War I
In June, 1917, Craig returned to the United States and was assigned as an instructor for the officer training camp based at Madison Barracks, New York.  In August, 1917 he was assigned to command a battery of the replacement battalion based in Syracuse, New York.  The battalion sailed for France in November, 1917 and upon arrival in December, Craig was assigned to the 5th Field Artillery Regiment.  He was selected for attendance at the Army Staff College in Langres and after his May, 1918 graduation, Craig was assigned to the I Corps staff as an assistant plans and training officer.

In June, 1918 Craig was assigned to the 157th Artillery Brigade as adjutant, and in July he was posted to the 4th Division as assistant plans and training officer.  From August to October, he was adjutant of the 4th Artillery Brigade, and from October to November he was assistant to the chief of artillery for Second United States Army.

Post-World War I
Following the Armistice with Germany that ended the war, Craig served as chief of staff for the American Section of the Permanent International Armistice Commission in France.  In February, 1919, he was posted to Trier, Germany to serve on the staff of the Army Center of Artillery Study.  He served with the 17th Field Artillery Regiment at Ehrenbreitstein, Germany before returning to the United States with the regiment.  He remained with the 17th Field Artillery at Camp Travis, San Antonio, Texas, until August, 1920, when he returned to the Coast Artillery Corps.  Craig was then posted to Fort Barrancas, Florida, as adjutant, followed by assignment to Fort McPherson, Georgia, on the Fourth Corps Area staff.

Craig completed the advanced course for officers at Fort Sill, Oklahoma's Field Artillery School in 1923.  He was then assigned as assistant professor of military science at Harvard University, where he remained until 1929, when he was selected for attendance at the United States Army Command and General Staff College.  He graduated in 1931 and was assigned to Savannah, Georgia, as the senior instructor for the Georgia National Guard.  From 1933 to 1936, Craig served as assistant inspector general for the Second Corps Area at Governors Island, New York, and he carried out a similar assignment for the Third Corps Area in Baltimore from 1936 to 1938.  In 1938, Craig was nominated for attendance at the United States Army War College, and he graduated in 1939.  He was then posted to Fort Sill as commander of 1st Battalion, 77th Field Artillery Regiment.

World War II
In July, 1941 Craig was assigned as commander of the 18th Field Artillery Regiment at Fort Sill.  In February, 1942 Craig was promoted to brigadier general and assigned as commander of the 72nd Field Artillery Brigade at Fort Leonard Wood, Missouri.  He was promoted to major general in February, 1943 as commander of the 97th Infantry Division at Camp Swift, Texas.  In January, 1944 Craig was named to command the XXIII Corps at Camp Bowie, Texas.  In August, 1944, he was assigned to command the 9th Infantry Division during combat in France.

Under his command, the 9th Infantry Division conducted offensive operations in France and Belgium and crossed the Meuse River at Dinant.  The 9th Division then penetrated the Siegfried Line near Monschau, then drove to the Rur River between Langerwehe and Düren.  During the Battle of the Bulge in December 1944-January 1945, the 9th Infantry Division held the left shoulder of the "Bulge" near Monschau.  The division then took part in the drive to capture the Rur River dams, then continued to drive to the Rhine River near Bonn.  In March, 1945 Craig commanded all US troops at the Remagen Bridgehead until they resumed the offensive, including the 99th, 78th, and 9th Infantry Divisions.  When the 9th Infantry Division resumed its offensive, it continued to the Ruhr Pocket and the Harz Mountains, then made contact with Soviet forces east of the Mulde River at the end of April.

Post-World War II

In May, 1945 Craig was named to command the XX Corps in Germany.  From June to July, 1945 Craig was commander of Third United States Army.  In October he was named to command the Seventh Service Command based at Omaha, Nebraska.  In February, 1946 he was assigned to command the Sixth Service Command in Chicago.  When Fifth United States Army was activated on June 11, 1946, Craig was appointed as its deputy commander.

From August, 1947 to April, 1948 Craig was inspector general of the United States European Command.  In April and May 1948, he served as commander of the United States Constabulary in Germany.  In July, 1948 Craig was appointed Inspector General of the Army, and he served until retiring in May 1952.

Awards
Craig was a recipient of the Army Distinguished Service Medal for his World War II service.  His additional decorations included the Silver Star, Legion of Merit, and Bronze Star Medal.  Craig's foreign awards for World War I included the Distinguished Service Order (Great Britain), Legion of Honor (Chevalier) (France); Croix de Guerre with palm (France); Croix de Guerre with palm (Belgium); Order of the Crown (Officer) (Belgium), and Order of Abdon Calderón (Ecuador).  His World War II foreign awards included the Legion of Honor (Officer) (France); Croix de Guerre with palm (France), Croix de Guerre with Palm (Belgium), Order of the Fatherland (USSR), and Czechoslovak War Cross.

Effective dates of promotion
Craig's dates of promotion were:
 Second lieutenant, 1913
 First lieutenant, July 1, 1916
 Captain, May 15, 1917
 Major (temporary), on July 3, 1918
 Lieutenant colonel (temporary), November 12, 1918
 Captain, June 30, 1920
 Major, July 1, 1920
 Lieutenant colonel, August 1, 1935
 Colonel (temporary), June 26, 1941
 Brigadier general (temporary), February 16, 1942
 Major general (temporary), February 4, 1943
 Brigadier general, February 27, 1947
 Major general, January 24, 1948

Death and burial
Craig died in Washington, D.C., on January 3, 1984.  Craig and Miriam Craig are buried at Arlington National Cemetery

Family
In 1917, Craig married Miriam Blount (1894–1987).  They were the parents of eight children – Louis Aleck; Miriam Malin; Barbara Gwynn; William Blount; Mary Faith; Francis Washington; Constance Anne; and Michael Frederick.

References

Sources

Newspapers

Books

External links
Louis Aleck Craig Jr. at ArlingtonCemetery.net, an unofficial website
Generals of World War II

|-

|-

|-

|-

|-

1891 births
1984 deaths
United States Army Cavalry Branch personnel
United States Military Academy alumni
United States Army Command and General Staff College alumni
United States Army War College alumni
Recipients of the Distinguished Service Medal (US Army)
Recipients of the Silver Star
Recipients of the Legion of Merit
Officiers of the Légion d'honneur
Recipients of the Croix de Guerre 1914–1918 (France)
Recipients of the Croix de Guerre 1939–1945 (France)
Recipients of the Croix de guerre (Belgium)
Officers of the Order of the Crown (Belgium)
Recipients of the Czechoslovak War Cross
Burials at Arlington National Cemetery
United States Army personnel of World War I
United States Army generals of World War II
United States Army generals
Harvard University faculty
Military personnel from New York (state)